Bhavana Sangama or simply Sangama was the father of the brothers Harihara I and Bukka Raya I, the founders of the Vijayanagara Empire.

Biography
He was the chieftain of a cowherd pastoralist community, which claimed descent from the illustrious Yadava race,  and was married to Maravve Nayakiti, the daughter of the Kampili king Kampili Deva Raya and the elder sister of prince Kumara Rama. He had 5 children, Harihara, Bukka, Kampa I, Marappa and Muddappa, who founded the Vijayanagara Empire (mainly by Harihara and Bukka)

Bibliography
 Dr. Suryanath U. Kamat, Concise history of Karnataka, MCC, Bangalore, 2001 (Reprinted 2002)
 Chopra, P.N. T.K. Ravindran and N. Subrahmaniam.History of South India. S. Chand, 2003.

References

Vijayanagara Empire
Yadava kingdoms
History of  India